Chithirai Festival, also known as Chithirai Thiruvizha, Meenakshi Kalyanam or Meenakshi Thirukalyanam, is an annual Tamil Hindu celebration in the city of Madurai during the month of April. The festival, celebrated during the Tamil month of Chithirai, is associated with the Meenakshi Temple, dedicated to the goddess Meenakshi, a form of Parvati and her consort Sundareshwar, a form of Shiva.

The festival lasts for one month. The first 15 days mark the celebrations of the coronation of Meenakshi as the divine ruler of Madurai and her marriage to Sundareshwar. The next 15 days mark the celebrations of the journey of Kallalagar or Alagar (a form of the god Vishnu) from his temple in Alagar Koyil to Madurai.

Legend 
As per the legend, Meenakshi was the daughter of the Pandya king Malayadhwaja Pandian and queen Kanchana Malai. The royal couple did not have a child for a long time, so Malayadhwaja Pandian performed special poojas and offered his prayers to God. During the pooja, a small girl came out of the fire and sat on the lap of the king. At that time, a divine voice from the sky told them that this child was an incarnation of Parvati (the wife of Shiva), and Shiva himself would come to marry her at the right age. Meenakshi was trained in warfare, and she was crowned as the queen of the Pandya kingdom after her father died. She conquered the whole world with her extraordinary war skills, and at last she went to Kailash (the abode of Shiva) to conquer it. When Meenakshi confronted Shiva in the battlefield, she fell in love with him and realized that she was a form of Parvati.

Shiva assured Meenakshi that he would come to Madurai to marry her. As promised, Shiva, along with all the gods and the sages, came to Madurai. Shiva as Sundareshwar married Meenakshi and ruled the Pandya kingdom under the name Sundara Pandyan. Their temple stands at the centre of Madurai. The Meenakshi festival was originally a separate Shaiva celebration. 

The Alagar festival is associated with the Vaishnava Kallalagar temple. Once, the sage Manduka was taking a bath in the holy waters of Aagaayagangai in Alagar hills. At that time, the short tempered sage, Durvasa, came by that way. Manduka missed his arrival, which Durvasa took as a insult and cursed Manduka to become a frog and live in the river Vaigai. On Manduka's beeseaching, Durvasa told him to go to Vaigai and pray to the Alagar form of Vishnu to be released from the curse.

Alagar was pleased by the prayers of Manduka, and went to the Vaigai river to lift the curse of Manduka. As per Manduka's wish, he showed him all his ten avatars and blessed him.

People in and around Madurai tell this story as the history of Chithirai Thiruvizha.

The wedding of Meenakshi with Sundareshwar was to happen in Madurai. Alagar, the brother of Meenakshi, was invited. He started on a 20 km journey from his abode at Alagar Hills towards Madurai. Alagar decided to travel disguised as a robber to protect himself and his belongings. At times, he had to hide to avoid getting arrested by soldiers. This, and the dense forest of Alagar Hills, delayed his journey further. This delay was purposely caused by Sundareshwar, and he himself took form of Alagar and performed the "Kanyathanam" (handing over a girl in marriage) of Meenakshi. This was enacted by Sundareshwar to prove that Vishnu and Shiva are one and the same. Later, when Alagar was crossing the Vaigai river, he learned that his sister's wedding was over. This made him furious. To pacify him, Meenakshi and Sundareshwar came to the Vaigai river. Alagar chose to give all the gifts that he carried to Meenakshi and Sundareshwar in a Mandapam in the middle of the Vaigai river, and returned to Alagar Hill without entering Madurai.

History 

Historically, the Meenakshi festival related to Shaiva sect and Alagar festival of the Vaishnava sect were separate events celebrated in different months. The Meenakshi festival was moved from the Tamil month of Maasi to month of Chithirai by the king Tirumala Nayaka (r. 1623-1659), giving the celebration its name, Chithirai Festival. Both festivals were merged into a single event to unite the people of the two Hindu sects (Shaiva and Vaishnava) as well as to boost Madurai's economy.

The location of culminating event of Alagar festival - the entering of the river by Alagar - was also moved from Thenur village to Madurai.

List of events 
The following are the list of events in the Chithirai festival.

Kodi Yetram  
During this event, the chief priest of the Meenakshi temple hoists the holy flag on the Dwajasthambam (flag pole) of the temple. This marks the beginning of the festival. The flag will stay on the flag pole until the end of the festival.

Pattabisekam  

Pattabisekam is a coronation ceremony. Meenakshi is crowned as the queen of Madurai on this day, and she will rule the Pandya Kingdom for the next four months. After that, her husband Sundareshwar will be crowned as the king of Madurai for the next eight months.

Dikvijayam  
After Meenakshi is crowned as the queen of the Pandya kingdom, she goes into war with all the countries in the world and conquers the whole world and she goes to Kailasha (the home of Shiva in Himalayas) to conquer it. However, after seeing Shiva on the battlefield, she falls in love with him and marries him.

Meenakshi Kalyanam 

Meenakshi Kalyanam is the wedding celebration of Meenakshi and Shiva (Sundareshwar) in Madurai. On the day of Meenakshi Kalyanam, devotees get up at sunrise and reach the Meenakshi temple in Madurai. After taking a holy dip in the golden lotus pond, they wear clean clothes. Meenakshi is first worshipped using traditional methods, following which prayers are offered to Viboothi Vinayakar. On this day, devotees sing devotional songs and bhajans. It is also considered auspicious to wear the holy ash known as Vibhuthi while entering the temple premises. Devotees also carry fruits, coconuts and incense sticks to offer to the deities. Inside the temple, the images of the deities are decorated with silk clothes and floral garlands. There are nearly 50 priests in the Meenakshi Madurai temple who perform the puja rituals and special prayers. The main priests in the temple perform the ritualistic wedding ceremonies. At the completion of the event, images of Meenakshi and Sundareshwar  are taken out in huge processions on the streets in the Pushpa Pallakku and Yaanai Vahanam.

Chariot festival 
The Chariot festival, also known as Ther Tiruvizha or Rathotsavam, is performed the day after Meenakshi Kalyanam. The king and queen of the Pandya Kingdom, Meenakshi and Sundareshwar come to see their subjects in a well-decorated chariot. It attracts many people in the Masi streets of Madurai as viewers.

Ethir Sevai 

Part of the Chithirai Thiruvizha of Kallazhagar temple at Alagar Koyil, the Ethir Seva began on the fourth day of the festival. On this day, Alagar changed his appearance as Kallar (Kallar vedam) when he traveled via Kallar Nadu and entered Madurai city and the people of the city welcomed him.

Alagar Vaigai Elenthuarulal 
After the holy marriage of Meenakshi, her brother Alagar tried to come to the marriage. Alagar came from Alagarkoil to Madurai slowly, making a couple of stops on the way. When he reached the Vaigai river bank, he heard that the wedding was over, so he got angry and returned to Alagarkoil after giving the gifts to Meenakshi and Sundareshwar, who came to receive him, but refused to enter Madurai. A reenactment of this event happens in a maiyya mandapam in Madhichiyam in the middle of river Vaigai.

Devendra Pooja
The Devendra Pooja is held at the fourteenth and final day of the Chithirai festival  in honour of lord Indra at the Meenakshi Sundareshwarar Temple at Madurai.

References

External links 

 Meenanski amman temple 

Tamil festivals
Culture of Madurai
Hindu festivals in India